Godfrey Robert Goldin (10 June 1919 – 7 February 1943) was a champion schoolboy Australian rules footballer who also played with Essendon in the Victorian Football League (VFL).

He died of wounds sustained in action while serving with the Second AIF in New Guinea during World War II.

Family
The son of Robert Vane Goldin (1886-1969), and Ellen Christina Goldin (1890-1973), née Graham, Godfrey Robert Goldin was born on 10 June 1919.

He was engaged to Grace Lillian Osborne in September 1942. They never married.

His younger brother, Allan "Dick" Goldin, played 104 games in six seasons (1947 to 1952) for the Preston Football Club in the Victorian Football Association (VFA). He later coached Preston Seconds.

Football

East Coburg State School
He was a champion schoolboy footballer, he played for the East Coburg State School team (coached by Jack Baggott, and represented Victoria in the 1933 Inter-State Schoolboys' Australian Rules Carnival in Brisbane.

Coburg Amateurs Football Club (VAFA)
He played for the Coburg Amateurs team that won the D Grade premiership in 1936.

Essendon (VFL)
Recruited by Essendon in 1937, he played a season with Essendon's Second XVIII before making his debut against North Melbourne on 27 May 1939.

With his early preseason training restricted by illness and injury, Goldin played several games with the Second XVIII in 1940.

Cricket
He played for Preston Cricket Club in the Victorian Sub-District Cricket Association.

Military service
He enlisted in the Second AIF on 11 March 1941.

Death
Having served in the North Africa, he died in New Guinea on 7 February 1943 of wounds he had sustained fighting against the Japanese in the Battle of Wau.

He was buried at the Port Moresby (Bomana) War Cemetery.

See also
 List of Victorian Football League players who died in active service

Footnotes

References
 
 Main, J. & Allen, D., "Goldin, Godfrey", pp.254-257 in Main, J. & Allen, D., Fallen – The Ultimate Heroes: Footballers Who Never Returned From War, Crown Content, (Melbourne), 2002. 
 Maplestone, M., Flying Higher: History of the Essendon Football Club 1872–1996, Essendon Football Club, (Melbourne), 1996. 
 World War Two Nominal Roll: Private Godfrey Robert Goldin (VX51038), Department of Veterans' Affairs.
 Roll of Honour: Private Godfrey Robert Goldin (VX51038), Australian War Memorial.
 Roll of Honour Circular: Private Godfrey Robert Goldin (VX51038), collection of the Australian War Memorial.
 Victorians in Casualty List: Australia and The Islands: Wounded in Action and Placed on the Dangerously Ill List, The Argus, (Friday, 19 February 1943), p.4.
 Victorians in Army Casualty List: Australia and The Islands: Previously Reported Wounded in Action, Now Reported Died of Wounds, The Argus, (Thursday, 4 March 1943), p.5.

External links

 
 Private Godfrey Robert Goldin (VX51038), Commonwealth War Graves Commission.

1919 births
1943 deaths
Australian rules footballers from Melbourne
Essendon Football Club players
Australian military personnel killed in World War II
Australian Army personnel of World War II
Australian Army soldiers
Burials at Port Moresby (Bomana) War Cemetery
Military personnel from Melbourne
People from Abbotsford, Victoria